

The subfamily Neanurinae contains pudgy short-legged springtails of the order Poduromorpha. It was established by Carl Börner in 1901 – or rather, it is the result of taxa being split out of Börner's family (initially proposed as a subfamily, but this had to be changed when springtails were discovered to be closely related to but not actually insects) whereas the type genus and its closest relatives were retained here.

Like other Neanuridae, they are stout-bodied springtails with vestigial furcula (Collembola), making them essentially unable to jump. Like their relatives, they lack anal thorns and have primitive ocelli.

Systematics

There are six tribes of Neanurinae currently recognized. Some notable genera are also listed here:
 Neanurini
 Deutonura
 Edoughnura Deharveng, Kroua & Bedons, 2007
 Endonura
 Neanura
 Protanura
 Morulodini
 Lobellini
 Paleonurini
 Bilobella
 Paranurini
 Sensillanurini

In addition, there are several genera incertae sedis, which cannot be assigned robustly to a tribe:
 Echinanura
 Paravietnura
 Graniloba
 Pseudadbiloba
 Pseudobiloba
 Zealandmeria

References

External links

Collembola
Arthropod subfamilies
Taxa named by Carl Julius Bernhard Börner
Neanuridae